Sharon Ann Jewell (born 9 April 1960 in Little Rock) is a former US Olympian in the sport of taekwondo.  She would train at Howard University under Dong Ja Yang. Sharon would earn a bronze medal in the 1988 Seoul Olympics. While there she would meet and date Olympic wrestler, Rodney Smith. After her career she became a taekwondo referee.

Her father, Jerry Jewell (politician), was the first African-American member of the Arkansas State Senate.

References

1960 births
Living people
American female taekwondo practitioners
Taekwondo practitioners at the 1988 Summer Olympics
African-American sportswomen
Medalists at the 1988 Summer Olympics
American referees and umpires
World Taekwondo Championships medalists
21st-century African-American people
21st-century African-American women
20th-century African-American sportspeople
20th-century African-American women
20th-century African-American people